The Women's individual normal hill event of the FIS Nordic World Ski Championships 2017 was held on 24 February 2017.

Results

Qualification
The qualification was held on 23 February 2017.

Final
The final was held on 24 February 2017.

References

Women's individual normal hill
2017 in Finnish women's sport